Dorchen A. Leidholdt is an activist and leader in the feminist movement against violence against women. Since the mid-1970s, she has counseled and advocated for rape victims, organized against "the media's promotion of violence against women", served on the legal team for the plaintiff in a precedent-setting sexual harassment case, founded an international non-governmental organization fighting prostitution and trafficking in women and children, directed the nation's largest legal services program for victims of domestic violence, advocated for the enactment and implementation of laws that further the rights of abused women, and represented hundreds of women victimized by intimate partner violence, human trafficking, sexual assault, the threat of honor killing, female genital mutilation, forced and child marriage, and the internet bride trade.

Leidholdt has lectured internationally on issues of violence against women, and has published articles, book chapters, and two anthologies.

Education
Leidholdt hold a master's degree from the University of Virginia, and a JD degree from New York University School of Law, where she was a Root-Tilden-Snow scholar.

Past career
From 1975 to 1977, Leidholdt counseled rape victims as a graduate student at the University of Virginia and, after moving to New York City in 1978, became an activist with the Women's Anti-Rape Coalition, the educational arm of New York Women Against Rape. From 1978 through 1980, she was a member of the New York City Chapter of Women Against Violence Against Women (WAVAW did not have "leaders"; nor did WAVAW advocate censorship like Dorchen did).

Leidholdt is known for her campaigns against pornography and for her suit against Hustler magazine publisher Larry Flynt. In 1979, after Hustler Magazine published an issue whose cover showed a naked female body being fed through a meat grinder, she joined Susan Brownmiller, Dolores Alexander (Past President of the National Organization for Women), and other New York City women's rights leaders in founding the feminist organization, Women Against Pornography (WAP).

From 1979 through 1983, she served as a leader and spokesperson for WAP, during which time she joined Gloria Steinem and other feminist leaders in initiating a suit against Hustler and Larry Flynt, appeared on numerous television and radio programs, organized educational events, and spoke in Washington D.C. before the U.S. Attorney General's Commission on Pornography (a.k.a. The Meese Commission) at the commission's invitation. There Leidholdt testified, "Pornography perpetuates the devaluation of women. It sexualizes bigotry, promotes rape and undermines women's self esteem."

Flynt published an attack on her in the magazine's "Asshole of the Month" column (July 1985).

In 1987, at New York University School of Law, she was the lead organizer of the conference, "The Sexual Liberals and the Attack on Feminism", and in 1988, she was the lead organizer of the first global conference on trafficking in women and girls.

Leidholdt is an opponent of "sex-positive feminism". Her main argument is that prostitution is exploitative towards women and has historically benefited men, not women.

Current career
Leidholdt is the Director of the Center for Battered Women's Legal Services at Sanctuary for Families in New York City. Under Leidholdt's leadership since 1994, the center has become the largest legal services program for domestic violence victims in the country. It has grown from two to twenty-four lawyers and eight support staff members, and has strengthened its advocacy efforts on behalf of under-served populations of women, especially those in New York City's immigrant communities. The center has spearheaded state litigation that set new legal precedent expanding the protections available to domestic violence victims petitioning for orders of protection and federal litigation preventing child protective agencies from charging battered mothers with "engaging in domestic violence".
 
Leidholdt also serves as a board member of the Coalition Against Trafficking in Women (CATW), which she helped found in 1988. She has represented the Coalition at numerous international meetings, including the World Conference on Human Rights (Vienna, 1993) and the Fourth World Conference on Women (Beijing, 1995). On 6 December 1996, in a special session commemorating the abolition of slavery, Leidholdt and a survivor of sex trafficking together addressed the General Assembly of the United Nations.

Leidholdt has taught Criminal Procedure at City University School of Law, and, since 1998, has taught Domestic Violence and the Law at Columbia University School of Law.

Activism
In 1990, Leidholdt became an associate of the Women's Institute for Freedom of the Press (WIFP). WIFP is an American nonprofit publishing organization. The organization works to increase communication between women and connect the public with forms of women-based media.

Awards and honors
United Nations Capitol Association Human Rights Award (1994),
The New York City Bar Association's Legal Services Award (1999) 
The Korean-American Family Service Center's Recognition Award (1999)
The City of New York Award for "outstanding leadership in breaking the cycle of domestic violence" (1999)
New York University School of Law Public Interest Law Foundation Award for "outstanding contributions in public interest law" (2000)
The Lawyers Committee Against Domestic Violence "In the Trenches" Award (2000) 
The "Women of Power and Influence" Award by the National Organization for Women—New York City Chapter (2002) 
League of Women Voters of the City of New York "Woman of Distinction" Award (2007) 
New York State Coalition Against Domestic Violence, "30 Years 30 Leaders" Award (2008)
New York University Law School Alumna of the Month Award (February 2008)

Selected publications

Books
  
Essays which originated as speeches and panel presentations at a conference on April 6, 1987, at the New York University Law School

Book chapters

Journal articles
  Pdf. 
 
See also: Anneka diLorenzo, Respondent, v. Penthouse International, Ltd., et al., Appellants

Notable court cases
Dorchen Leidholdt vs. Hustler Magazine, 647 F. Supp. 1283 (D. Wyo. 1986)
Dorchen Leidholdt vs. Larry Flynt, 860 F.2d 890 (9th Cir. 1988)

See also

 Feminist views on transgender topics

References

External links
Biographical sketch of Leidholdt at the Coalition Against Trafficking in Women official site.
"Prosecuting The Batterer Without The Victim's Approval" by Emily Jane Goodman, Gotham Gazette, June 2003.
"Demand and Debate" speech by Leidholdt providing a "history of CATW and the feminist understanding of trafficking and prostitution."
New York's Choking Loophole, op-ed for The New York Times by Leidholdt and Jane Manning (3 March 2010)
"Successfully Prosecuting Sex Traffickers" — Leidholdt's testimony before the United States House Committee on the Judiciary hearing on "Combating Modern Slavery: Reauthorization of Anti-Trafficking Programs" (1 November 2007)
Brief bio and contact information for Leidholdt at the Sanctuary for Families official site.

20th-century American women writers
21st-century American women writers
Activists against female genital mutilation
American feminists
American legal scholars
Anti-pornography feminists
Anti-prostitution feminists
Feminist studies scholars
Living people
New York University School of Law alumni
University of Virginia alumni
Women legal scholars
Place of birth missing (living people)
Year of birth missing (living people)